Rudolf Kloeckner (born 10 June 1917) was a Romanian alpine skier. He competed in the men's combined event at the 1936 Winter Olympics.

References

External links
 

1917 births
Possibly living people
Romanian male alpine skiers
Romanian male cross-country skiers
Olympic alpine skiers of Romania
Olympic cross-country skiers of Romania
Alpine skiers at the 1936 Winter Olympics
Cross-country skiers at the 1936 Winter Olympics
Place of birth missing (living people)